Lothar Seegers (3 October 1947 – 6 August 2018) was a German ichthyologist. Seegers authored 9 species within the family of Rivulidae.

Publications (selection) 
 The Fishes of the Lake Rukwa Drainage. Koninklijk Museum voor Midden-Afrika, 1996. 
 Killifishes of the world: Old World Killis II. A.C.S. GmbH, 1997. 
 Killifishes of the World: New World Killis. A.C.S., 2000. 
 The catfishes of Africa: A Handbook for Identification and Maintenance. Aqualog Verlag, 2008.

See also
:Category:Taxa named by Lothar Seegers

References

External links 

1947 births
2018 deaths
Taxon authorities
German ichthyologists
20th-century German zoologists